Shekou Cruise Center, also known as the Shekou Ferry Terminal and the Shekou Prince Bay Cruise Homeport, is a cruise terminal located in Shekou, Nanshan District, Shenzhen, China. It runs direct ferry connections from Shenzhen to destinations across the Pearl River Delta. It is operated by China Merchants Shekou Ferry Terminal Service Co., Ltd. Ferry operations are operated by Xunlong Ferries, TurboJET and CKS Ferries. It can also handle cruise ships docking and replenishment, and is the first cruise terminal in China. This facility replaces the former Shekou Passenger Terminal and is part of a larger urban renewal and redevelopment along Shenzhen Bay.

History
It was announced by the operating company, in December 2013, that a major redevelopment will take place. Construction started in 2014. The first cruise ship, the SuperStar Virgo of Star Cruises tied alongside, on Friday afternoon October 14, 2016, ahead of the terminal's opening party. The new Shenzhen Prince Bay Cruise Homeport will open on November 1, 2016.

Structure
The triangular shaped terminal building designed by the French architect  allows for a much larger space than the former ferry terminal. It features 12 ferries berths and 2 cruise ship berths.

Destinations
There are 30 ships operating from the terminal, of which 22 are high speed luxury ferries, and 8 are ordinary high speed ferries. These service five scheduled high speed passenger ship lines (namely Shekou to Hong Kong International Airport, Hong Kong, Macau Peninsula, Macau's Taipa Island and Zhuhai) and nonscheduled charter services to Pearl River Delta islands.

Pre-check in service is available for certain flights departing from Hong Kong International Airport, so at Shekou Terminal, passengers can directly get the boarding pass and baggage delivery service for flights taking off from Hong Kong International Airport. Participating airlines are as follows for check-in services:-

All Nippon Airways (NH) 	  			  		 
Cathay Pacific Airways (CX) 						
China Airlines (CI) 						  	  	  	  		  	 
EVA Airways (BR) 						 
Garuda Indonesia (GA) 						 
Hong Kong Airlines (HX) 						 
Hong Kong Express Airways (UO) 						 
Japan Airlines (JL) 						 
Mandarin Airlines (AE) 						  	  	  	  		  	 
Singapore Airlines (SQ) 	  	  	  	  		 
Turkish Airlines (TK) 	  	  	  	  		 
United Airlines (UA)

Ground transportation

The closest metro station is Taiziwan. Taxis are available in the parking area. A free shuttle bus service links with the old Shekou Ferry Terminal, near exit C of the Shekou Port metro station. A bus depot is located near the station offering services across the city.

References

External links

 Shenzhen Prince Bay Cruise Homeport

Buildings and structures in Shenzhen
Ferry terminals in China